The 1975 Little All-America college football team, also known as the College Division All-America football team, is composed of college football players from small colleges and universities who were selected by the Associated Press (AP) as the best players at each position. The AP selected three teams, each consisting of separate offensive and defensive platoons.

First team

Offense
 Tight end -  David Hill, Texas A&I
 Wide receiver -  Sammy White, Grambling
 Offensive tackles - Steve Musulin, Guilford; Mike Timmermans, Northern Iowa
 Offensive guards - Ned Deane, Massachusetts; Mark Law, Hillsdale
 Center  - Kevin Martell, New Hampshire
 Quarterback - Lynn Hieber, Indiana (PA)
 Running backs - Vince Allen, Indiana State; Bill Deutsch, North Dakota; Terry Egerdahl, Minnesota-Duluth

Defense
 Defensive ends - Willie "Foots" Lee, Bethune Cookman; Lawrence Pillers, Alcorn State
 Defensive tackles - Larry Czarnecki, Ithaca; Bobby Kotzur, Southwest Texas State
 Middle guard - Junior Hardin, Eastern Kentucky
 Linebackers - Greg Blankenship, Hayward State; Rick Green, Western Kentucky; Bill Linnenkohl, Puget Sound
 Defensive backs - Ralph Gebhardt, Rochester; James Hunter, Grambling; Anthony Leonard, Virginia Union

See also
 1975 College Football All-America Team

References

Little All-America college football team
Little All-America college football team
Little All-America college football team
Little All-America college football teams